Haptista is a proposed group of protists made up of centrohelids and haptophytes. Phylogenomic studies indicate that Haptista, together with Ancoracysta twista, forms a sister clade to the SAR+Telonemia supergroup, but it may also be sister to the Cryptista (+Archaeplastida). It is thus one of the earliest diverging Diaphoretickes.

Taxonomy
Based on studies done by Cavalier-Smith, Chao & Lewis 2015 and Ruggiero et al. 2015.
 Subphylum Centroheliozoa Cushman & Jarvis 1929 sensu Durrschmidt & Patterson 1987 [Heliozoa Haeckel 1862 stat. n. Margulis 1974 em. Cavalier-Smith 2003]
 Class Centrohelea Kuhn 1926 stat. n. Cavalier-Smith 1993 [Centroplastiales; Centrohelina Hartmann 1913; Centroplasthelida Febvre-Chevalier 1984]
 Subphylum Haptophytina Cavalier-Smith 2015 (Haptophyta Hibberd 1976 sensu Ruggerio et al. 2015)
 Clade Rappemonada Kim et al. 2011
 Class Rappephyceae Cavalier-Smith 2015
 Clade Haptomonada (Margulis & Schwartz 1998) [Haptophyta Hibberd 1976 emend. Edvardsen & Eikrem 2000; Prymnesiophyta Green & Jordan, 1994; Prymnesiomonada; Prymnesiida Hibberd 1976; Haptophyceae Christensen 1962 ex Silva 1980; Haptomonadida; Patelliferea Cavalier-Smith 1993]
 Class Pavlovophyceae (Cavalier-Smith 1986) Green & Medlin 2000
 Class Prymnesiophyceae Christensen 1962 emend. Cavalier-Smith 1996 [Haptophyceae s.s.; Prymnesiophycidae Cavalier-Smith 1986; Coccolithophyceae Casper 1972 ex Rothmaler 1951]

References

External links

 Tree of Life: Hacrobia

 
Taxa named by Thomas Cavalier-Smith
Infrakingdoms